Marten is a town in the northern part of Bulgaria. It is located in Ruse Province.

Geography 
The town is located on the right bank of the Danube. In the site called Yamata a meteorite crater, unique for Bulgaria, is located.

History 
The town was founded as a Roman Fortress called Tegra (Tegris, Tigris) in the 1st century AD, a part of the fortifications on the Danube border of the Empire.  It is supposed to have existed also during the Second Bulgarian Empire. In early Ottoman documents it is named Maruteni.

Marten was proclaimed a town on August 7, 2006, by the House of Ministers of the Republic of Bulgaria.

Marten Crag on Trinity Peninsula in Antarctica is named after the town.

Historic Sights 
"St. George" church, built in 1896.

Annual Events 
Marten Fair is organized annually on May 6.

Notes 

Towns in Bulgaria
Populated places in Ruse Province